Fe, Esperanza, Caridad  is a 1974 Filipino film, produced by Premiere Productions. It is a trilogy featuring Nora Aunor giving life to the stories of three women: Fe—an emerging movie superstar who has an invalid husband—, Esperanza—a young wife living in a middle-class neighborhood in the city—and Caridad—a young novice who was seduced by the devil himself.

The film was directed by three acclaimed directors namely Cirio H. Santiago and two National Artists for Film; Gerardo de Leon and Lamberto V. Avellana.

Synopsis

Fe (First Segment)

Esperanza (Second Segment)

Caridad (Third Segment)

Caridad  ("Charity") (Nora Aunor), a nun who loves Rodrigo (Ronaldo Valdez), the gardener in the convent. Caridad is experiencing a complex feeling of a woman fighting for the love she for Rodrigo and her vow as a nun. When Caridad discovered that Rodrigo and Satan are the same entity, Rodrigo made her life like hell. Although repugnant, Caridad continued dealing with Rodrigo in the hope that she could convince him to return to the Lord. In return for that plea, Caridad will do anything, even jump off the cliff.

Cast

Fe
Nora Aunor as Fe
Dindo Fernando as Tony Artiaga
Ruben Rustia as Don Benito

Esperanza
 Nora Aunor as Caridad
Jay Ilagan aa Doming
Divina Valencia as Aling Vina
Bert LeRoy Jr. as Vic
Rosa Aguirre as Aling Rosa
Romy Lapus as Boyet
Rino Bermudez as Mang Inggo

Caridad
Nora Aunor as Caridad
Ronaldo Valdez as Rodrigo/Satan
Patria Plata as Mother Superior
Subas Herrero as Demon
Laurice Guillen as Marta

Recognition

References

External links

Filipino-language films
1974 films
Philippine action comedy films
Tagalog-language films